John Ogilvie (born 3 December 1969) is a New Zealand cricketer. He played in ten List A matches for Central Districts from 1994 to 1996.

See also
 List of Central Districts representative cricketers

References

External links
 

1969 births
Living people
New Zealand cricketers
Central Districts cricketers
Cricketers from Motueka